Tharindu Mendis (born 21 April 1981) is a former Sri Lankan cricketer and currently coaches the Colombo District club. He has played in more than 100 first-class matches since 2000/01. He is also the elder brother of Sri Lankan national cricketer, Jeevan Mendis.

Fixing allegations

Tharindu Mendis who turned his profession from cricketer to a cricket coach has been found guilty for involving in discussing with the match-fixers on planning to fix England's upcoming first Test against Sri Lanka in November 2018. He along with former Indian domestic cricketer Robin Morris and Pakistani domestic cricketer Hasan Raza were reported by Qatar news network, Al Jazeera for planning to tamper the pitch conditions at the Galle International Stadium prior to the start of the Test series between England and Sri Lanka in November 2018.

Sri Lanka Cricket (SLC) suspended Tharindu Mendis and the Galle groundsman Tharanga Indika with immediate effect following the controversy.

References

External links
 

1981 births
Living people
Sri Lankan cricketers
Colombo Cricket Club cricketers
Moors Sports Club cricketers
Cricketers from Colombo